Knizhnik or Knijnik (Cyrillic script: Книжник) is a Ukrainian and Russian occupational surname, meaning "librarian" (or "scribe").

It may refer to the following individuals:

 Vadim Knizhnik — a Soviet physicist of Jewish and Russian descent.
 Shana Knizhnik — an American lawyer and author from Philadelphia.

See also
 Knizhnik–Zamolodchikov equations

References

Ukrainian-language surnames
Russian-language surnames
Occupational surnames